This is a list of winners and nominations for the Tony Award for Best Lighting Design for outstanding lighting design of a play or musical. The award was first presented in 1970. Since 2005, the category was divided into Lighting Design in a Play and Lighting Design in a Musical with each genre receiving its own award.

Winners and nominees

1970s

1980s

1990s

2000s

2010s

2020s

Award records

Multiple wins 

 9 Wins

 Jules Fisher

   7 Wins

 Natasha Katz

 5 Wins
 Brian MacDevitt
 4 Wins

 Kevin Adams

 3 Wins

 Neil Austin
 Andrew Bridge
 Peggy Eisenhauer 
 David Hersey
 Tharon Musser

 2 Wins

 Christopher Akerlind
 Howell Binkley
 Paule Constable
 Donald Holder
 Bradley King
 Jennifer Tipton
 Hugh Vanstone

Multiple nominations 

 24 Nominations
 Jules Fisher

 15 Nominations
 Natasha Katz

 14 Nominations
 Donald Holder
 
 12 Nominations
 Brian MacDevitt
 
 11 Nominations
 Kenneth Posner

 9 Nominations
 Ken Billington 
 Howell Binkley
 Peggy Eisenhauer 
 Tharon Musser

   8 Nominations
 Kevin Adams

 7 Nominations
 David Hersey

 6 Nominations
 Paule Constable

 5 Nominations
 Christopher Akerlind
 Martin Aronstein
 Peter Kaczorowski
 Jennifer Tipton
 Neil Austin
 Hugh Vanstone

 4 Nominations
 Neil Peter Jampolis
 Justin Townsend
 Allen Lee Hughes

 3 Nominations
 Andrew Bridge
 Pat Collins
 Mark Henderson
 Thomas R. Skelton
 Ben Stanton
 Jan Versweyveld
 Jane Cox
 Bradley King

 2 Nominations
 John Bury
 Ian Calderon
 Howard Harrison
 Peter Mumford
 Richard Nelson
 Jiyoun Chang
 Jon Clark

See also 

 Tony Award for Best Lighting Design in a Musical
 Tony Award for Best Lighting Design in a Play
 Drama Desk Award for Outstanding Lighting Design
 Laurence Olivier Award for Best Lighting Design

External links
Tony Awards Official site
Tony Awards at Internet Broadway database Listing
Tony Awards at broadwayworld.com

Tony Awards
Stage lighting
Awards established in 1970
1970 establishments in the United States